The Europe/Africa Zone was one of three zones of regional competition in the 2014 Fed Cup.

Group I 
 Venue: Syma Sport and Events Centre, Budapest, Hungary (indoor hard)
 Date: 4–9 February

The sixteen teams were divided into four pools of four teams. The four pool winners took part in play-offs to determine the two nations advancing to the World Group II play-offs. The nations finishing last in their pools took part in relegation play-offs, with the two losing nations being relegated to Group II for 2015.

Pools

Play-offs 

  and  advanced to World Group II play-offs.

Group II 
 Venue: Šiauliai Tennis School, Šiauliai, Lithuania (indoor hard)
 Dates: 16–19 April

The eight teams were divided into two pools of four teams. The two nations placing first and second took part in play-offs to determine the two nations advancing to Group I. The nations finished last in their pools took part in relegation play-offs, with the two losing nations being relegated to Group III for 2015.

Pools

Play-offs 

  and  advanced to Europe/Africa Group I in 2015.

Group III 
 Venue: Tere Tennis Center, Tallinn, Estonia (indoor hard)
 Dates: 5–8 February

The twelve teams were divided into four pools of three teams. The four pool winners took part in play-offs to determine the two nations advancing to Group II for 2015.

Pools

Play-offs 

  and  advanced to Europe/Africa Group II in 2015.

References 

 Fed Cup Result, 2014 Europe/Africa Group I
 Fed Cup Result, 2014 Europe/Africa Group II
 Fed Cup Result, 2014 Europe/Africa Group III

External links 
 Fed Cup website

 
International sports competitions in Budapest
Tennis tournaments in Hungary
Sport in Šiauliai
Tennis tournaments in Lithuania
Sports competitions in Tallinn
Tennis tournaments in Estonia
2000s in Budapest
21st century in Tallinn
February 2014 sports events in Europe
April 2014 sports events in Europe